Rover is an unincorporated community and census-designated place (CDP) in Yell County, Arkansas, United States. Rover has a post office with ZIP code 72860. It was first listed as a CDP in the 2020 census with a population of 159.

Facilities 

There is a small automotive/mechanical repair business, a church, and a local city water office. The only store is a small grocery with gasoline and diesel available.
 
Rover is close to Nimrod Lake, which has swimming areas and freshwater fishing. The lake has RV and tent camping spaces which are maintained by Arkansas Game and Fish and the Arkansas Army Corps of Engineers.

Education 
Public education is administered by the Two Rivers School District, which supports:
 Two Rivers High School—Serves students in grades 7–12.
 Two Rivers Elementary School—Serves students in Kindergarten through 6th grade.

It was previously in the Plainview-Rover School District until July 1, 2004, when it merged into the Two Rivers School District. The merged district formerly operated Plainview-Rover Elementary School (later Plainview Elementary School) and Plainview-Rover High School. In 2010 Plainview-Rover High closed as Two Rivers High opened. In 2012 Plainview Elementary closed as Two Rivers Elementary opened.

Demographics

2020 census

Note: the US Census treats Hispanic/Latino as an ethnic category. This table excludes Latinos from the racial categories and assigns them to a separate category. Hispanics/Latinos can be of any race.

References

Unincorporated communities in Yell County, Arkansas
Unincorporated communities in Arkansas
Census-designated places in Yell County, Arkansas
Census-designated places in Arkansas